Kurt Nemetz (21 July 1926 – 6 February 2008) was an Austrian cyclist. He competed at the 1948 and 1952 Summer Olympics.

References

1926 births
2008 deaths
Austrian male cyclists
Olympic cyclists of Austria
Cyclists at the 1948 Summer Olympics
Cyclists at the 1952 Summer Olympics
20th-century Austrian people